Florian Schmidt (born 31 March 1986 in Frankfurt an der Oder) is a German sport shooter who competes in the men's 10 metre air pistol and the men's 50 metre pistol. At the 2008 Summer Olympics, he finished 37th in the 10 metre air pistol and 28th in the 50 metre pistol. At the 2012 Summer Olympics, he finished 25th in the qualifying round for the 10 metre air pistol, failing to make the cut for the final, and 17th in the 50 metre pistol.

References

External links 
 
 
 

German male sport shooters
Living people
Olympic shooters of Germany
Shooters at the 2008 Summer Olympics
Shooters at the 2012 Summer Olympics
Shooters at the 2015 European Games
European Games competitors for Germany
1986 births
Sportspeople from Frankfurt (Oder)
21st-century German people